8 Million Stories is the first studio album by American hip hop duo Soul Position. It was released on Fat Beats Records under license from Rhymesayers Entertainment on October 7, 2003. It peaked at number 91 on the Billboard Top R&B/Hip-Hop Albums chart.

Critical reception
At Metacritic, which assigns a weighted average score out of 100 to reviews from mainstream critics, the album received an average score of 82% based on 8 reviews, indicating "universal acclaim".

Rollie Pemberton of Pitchfork gave the album a 7.5 out of 10, saying, "it's obvious that this amalgam between one of the most promising rappers in the underground and the most in-demand producer in the industry is a winning combination." Dominic Umile of PopMatters said, "Soul Position's debut LP serves as a sturdy platform for the team's individual talents while being a credible portrait of their union."

Track listing

Charts

References

External links
 

2003 debut albums
Soul Position albums
Rhymesayers Entertainment albums